The Sound of Trees is the first album by Schnell Fenster.

Track listing
All lyrics by Philip Judd; all music by Schnell Fenster

"Whisper"
"Love-Hate Relationship"
"Sleeping Mountain"
"That's Impossible"
"This Illusion"
"Lamplight"
"The Sound of Trees"
"White Flag"
"Long Way Down"
"Skin the Cat"
"Run-a-Mile"
"Never Stop"

Personnel
Schnell Fenster
 Philip Judd - guitar, keyboards, vocals; trumpet on "Lamplight" and "Never Stop"
 Nigel Griggs - bass guitar
 Noel Crombie - drums, percussion
 Michael den Elzen - guitars, guitar synthesizer, keyboards
Schnell Fenster - backing vocals
with:
The Brasstards - brass on "Love-Hate Relationship" and "This Illusion"
Technical
Alan Winstanley, Chris Corr, Clive Martin, Ian McKenzie, Paul Kosky - engineer

Charts

References

Schnell Fenster albums
1988 debut albums
Albums produced by Clive Langer
Albums produced by Alan Winstanley
Atlantic Records albums